The Munich horse market took place from 1883 in the Schmellerhalle, on the edge of the then newly built halls of the Munich slaughterhouse, originally twice a week under the name Rossmarkt.

Since the 1970s, the horse market has only been held once a month, on the first Saturday of the month. At the end of 1972, the horse market had to move from the Schmellerhalle to the cattle yard hall because the land owner, the City of Munich, sold the Schmeller site. Apartments were built on the site. In December 2006 the last Munich horse market took place. The hall, which was in danger of collapsing, was demolished. The organizer, the purchasing and delivery cooperative of the cattle merchants Bayerns eG, then moved the horse market to the Oberlandhalle in Miesbach, where the market first took place in the old and from 2014 to December 2015 in the new Oberlandhalle. After the general conditions in the new Oberlandhalle in Miesbach developed negatively until December 2015, the organizer moved the horse market to Ingolstadt. The date of the first Ingolstadt horse market was set for February 6, 2016.

In Ingolstadt, too, the horse market takes place every first Saturday of the month, with a few exceptions. Horse dealers from all over Bavaria offer their horses. In the catering trade, horse sausages and horse meat were offered. At times, small animals (rabbits, hares, chickens, etc.) were also sold.
Table of Contents.

Gallery 
Scenes from the Munich horse market in 1996:

Scenes from the horse market (Neue Oberlandhalle) 2015:

References

External links

 Süddeutsche.de: Bilder aus einer vergangenen Welt Photographs from the Munich horse market from 1996
 Horse market in Ingolstadt
 Homepage of the organizer

Events in Munich
Economy of Munich
Horses
Horse trade